Peter Haggarty (born 3 September 1937) was a Scottish footballer who started his career with junior side Duntocher Hibs before moving on to play 'senior' for Dumbarton.

References

1937 births
Scottish footballers
Dumbarton F.C. players
Scottish Football League players
Duntocher Hibernian F.C. players
Association football central defenders
Living people